Santa Cruz, officially the Municipality of Santa Cruz, is a 1st class municipality in the province of Davao del Sur, Philippines. According to the 2020 census, it has a population of 101,125 people.

The Municipality of Santa Cruz is part of Metropolitan Davao.

History 
Santa Cruz is the oldest municipality in the province; it was founded on October 5, 1884, thirty-six years after the foundation of Davao, which is its mother city, by Don Jose Uyanguren of Guipúzcoa, Spain. It all started when Spanish pioneers and missionaries attempted to settle and Christianize the area in what is now Barangay Poblacion as early as 1880. But because of the relentless Islamic faith of the local people in the area, the enraged pioneers and missionaries planted a cross under a shelter to mark the failure of the missionaries to convert these people to Christianity; the town's name now bears the name of the cross planted by those Spaniards. Fortunately, for the next 4 years, the local people will submit themselves to Christianity and had themselves conquered by Angel Rodriguez, the Spanish Governor-General of Davao. But, like Don Uyanguren's attempt to develop the newly established Davao, the area around the young town did not prosper until after almost 20 years since then.

The Americans arrived in Davao in the early 1900s after the Spanish defeat in the Spanish–American War. Fourteen years later, the town began to grow economically, although overshadowed by the booming economic growth of its neighbour Davao. Several Japanese entrepreneurs like Kyusaburo Otta and Yoshizo Furukawa are living in the region to exploit more agricultural territories, the former in Davao and the latter in what is now the barangays Darong and Inauayan.

On March 16, 1936, its mother town, Davao, became one of the first two cities in Mindanao, the other being Zamboanga, due to the town's faster economic growth and agricultural boom.

On 1942, it was the beginning of Japanese invasion of the Philippines. The town suffered greatly during the Japanese occupation of the Philippines, unlike its neighbor Davao, which fared well and continued its economic growth during that time. The local recognized guerrillas and the military troops of the Philippine Commonwealth Army units continued to attack the Imperial Japanese forces. On 1945, combined Filipino and American troops including recognized guerrillas fought the Japanese and liberated the town. The general headquarters of the Philippine Commonwealth Army and Philippine Constabulary was active from 1945 to 1946 and was located in the town. After the war, most of the inhabitants of Santa Cruz moved to Davao in search of economic opportunities; despite this, the town continued its population and economic growth, though at a slower rate.

Almost three years after the Philippine Independence on July 4, 1946, two towns broke off from the municipality, namely: Padada, on July 15, 1949; and Digos on July 19 in the same year. In 1960's, a new municipality, Roxas, was carved out from the town, covering the present-day barangays of Inauayan, Darong, Astorga, Coronon, and Sibulan; however, the Supreme Court of the Philippines nullified the creation of the municipality since this meant the collapse of the jurisdiction of once the most Christianized town in Mindanao.

One of the municipalities which broke off from the town, Digos, became the capital town of the newly created Davao del Sur province in 1967; thirty-three years later it would become a city and will be the most populous in the entire province, excluding Davao City.

Aspiration for cityhood

On October 5, 2013, during the town's 129th anniversary of its existence, its local government leaders and populace have envisioned for a new aspiration for the town to become a city, given the presence of large industrial companies like the San Miguel Corporation, Coco Davao Inc., Franklin Baker Co., GSL Food Industries in the town. The municipal mayor Joel Ray Lopez commented, "As the oldest town in the province of Davao del Sur, we really wanted it to become a city soon." Its infrastructure have been moderately improved, and most of its cityhood requirements, specifically its income and total land area requirements, have been already met. When the municipality of Santa Cruz finally becomes a city, full industrialization in the area may be expected.

Geography 
Santa Cruz situates in the Northern part of Davao del Sur. Bounded by Davao City on the north and south by the city of Digos. After undergoing several political subdivisions, 27,960 hectares of land was left representing 6.7% of the total land area of Davao del Sur. Forest land comprises 60% and the rest includes the 8 coastal barangays in the area.

The land area of Santa Cruz per Board of Technical Survey and Maps is 27,960 hectares. However, based on the Field Appraisal and Assessment Sheets (FAAS) and Tax Maps of the Municipal Assessor's Office the total land area of the municipality is 28,759.7855 or about 7.31% of the province's area (393,401 hectares). This excludes the Kapatagan contested area. Among the 18 barangays, Sibulan has the biggest land area of 6,390.6581 hectares or 22.22% of the total land area. Poblacion Zone III has the smallest area of 105.3148, only 0.37% of the total.

Topography
Santa Cruz is traversed by mountain ranges and high relief that include part of Mount Apo, the highest mountain peak in the Philippines, straddle the south, central, north and north-western portions of the municipality. The rugged topography of the central area gradually undulates toward the coastal plains of the north-eastern, eastern and south-eastern parts. Here, settlements sprawl contiguously along the coast of Davao Gulf under the vast monotony of coconut plantations. On the western frontier, a plateau stretches toward Barangay Kapatagan of Digos.

Climate

Santa Cruz has a favorable climate all year round characterized by wet and dry seasons. It is outside the typhoon belt. Generally the months of November to April are dry periods. Wet season occurs from May to October. This type of climate is observable in the plain and coastal areas. In the mountainous barangays, the fourth type of climate is consistently experienced. Rainfall is more or less evenly distributed throughout the year. Most often in these areas heavy downpour occurs every afternoon while in the morning the sun shines.

Barangays
Santa Cruz is politically subdivided into 18 barangays. Of the 18 barangays, 7 are uplands, 9 are upland-lowland and coastal and 2 are lowland-coastal.

Demographics

Languages
The languages spoken here in the municipality are Davaoeño, Tagalog, Mansakan, and English.

Economy 

Agriculture: Among agricultural crops, coconut leads in production followed by banana and sugarcane. Other major crops are corn, coffee and vegetables. The municipality also produces high value fruits like mango, lanzones and durian. Cattle leads in livestock production.

Fisheries: The 24-kilometer long coastline of Santa Cruz, which forms part of Davao Gulf, provides a rich fishing grounds and is suitable for aquaculture.

Mining: Deposits of sulfur ore, rock phosphate, guano, limestone and cement raw materials were also traced but still have to be tapped for commercial and industrial uses.

Forestry: Tropical evergreen and other timber cover the vast timberland and forest area. Rattan, bamboo and other vines are also in abundance.

Major industries: Banana, Coconut, and Seaweed cultivation.

Tourism

A famous competitive tourism destination in Southern Mindanao where eco-cultural and adventure tourism are properly managed and environmental protection is sustained through the partnership of the private sector and the government.

Sibulan - Mount Apo Trail History revealed that the year 1880 marked the first successful climb to Mount Apo through the Sibulan Trail of Santa Cruz in Davao del Sur by a group led by Don Joaquin Rajal. Trekking along the trail will be highlighted with an assault via Boulder Face going to the summit of the country's highest peak.

Sibulan River White Water Tubing Tubing along the rapids of Sibulan River using inflated tubes of rubber tires will drive one's adrenalin rush to the limits with the strong water current of the Sibulan River.

Tibolo Cultural Village Learn the unique culture of the indigenous Bagobo-Tagabawa Tribe and enjoy the view of the entire Mt. Apo landscape and overlooking scenery of Davao City and Davao Gulf.

Bato and Tagabuli Seascape Passig Islet in Barangay Bato and the Tagabuli Sea Rock Garden offer white sand beaches ideal for island hopping, scuba diving and fishing while giving the tourists a view of the symbiotic relationship of the ecosystem in the highlands down to the coastal system.

Other scenic spots include the Passig Islet Agro Eco Park and Tudaya Falls.

Events and festivals

Pista sa Kinaiyahan A yearly activity conducted every last week of April as a tribute to the Mother Nature through tree-growing, cleanup activities and Boulder Face challenge.

Araw ng Santa Cruz It is celebrated every October 5 in commemoration of the legal creation of the municipality in 1884. Highlights include parades, field demonstrations, trade fairs, carnivals and traditional festivities.

Sinabbadan Festival A festival of ethnic ritual and dances celebrated every September.

Transportation 
Santa Cruz is accessible by land transportation vehicles plying the Davao-Digos, Davao-Kidapawan City, Davao-Cotabato City, Davao-Koronadal City and Davao-Tacurong City routes passing through the town's single,  stretch of national highway that traverses its 11 barangays.

Air and water transport is accessible in the area through the international air and sea ports located in Davao City. Traveling overland is catered to by the Santa Cruz Overland Transport Terminal. Concrete-paved national highway runs along Santa Cruz connecting the cities of Davao and General Santos and adjacent provinces like South Cotabato, Sultan Kudarat, Maguindanao and Cotabato Province. Jeepneys and buses are used widely for major routes plying across the town. Mostly tricycles operate in the poblacion (town center) and in neighboring barangays. Bikes are used for leisure and sporting events.

Notable personalities

 Nesthy Petecio, Olympic medalist for boxing
 Ronald dela Rosa, politician, former police general

References

External links

   Santa Cruz Profile at the DTI Cities and Municipalities Competitive Index
 [ Philippine Standard Geographic Code]
Philippine Census Information
Otopphilippines

Municipalities of Davao del Sur